Root of ansa cervicalis may refer to:

 Inferior root of ansa cervicalis
 Superior root of ansa cervicalis